The 1900 Summer Olympics in Paris were the first Olympics at which Canadian athletes participated. Two Canadians participated, although not as a  national team (These were not introduced until later Olympics).  Canada's Olympians were George Orton and Ronald J. MacDonald. Orton was the first Canadian to win a medal, finishing first in the 2500-metre steeplechase.  He later finished third in the 400-metre hurdles and fifth in the 4000-metre steeplechase.  Orton, who was at school at the University of Pennsylvania, had accompanied a United States delegation to the games.

Medalists

Results by event

Athletics

Both of Canada's competitors competed in athletics, with Orton taking a gold and a bronze medal to tie the nation for 4th on the athletics medal leaderboard.

References

sports-reference

Nations at the 1900 Summer Olympics
1900
Olympics